La Coupole is a famous brasserie in Montparnasse in Paris.  It was founded in 1927 during the Roaring Twenties when Montparnasse housed a large artistic and literary community – expatriates and members of the Lost Generation.  They decorated the place in the contemporary art deco style and were regular patrons.

References

French companies established in 1927
Buildings and structures in the 6th arrondissement of Paris
Coffeehouses and cafés in Paris
Drinking establishments in Paris
Restaurants established in 1927
Restaurants in Paris